The following is a list of ecoregions in Djibouti as identified by the World Wide Fund for Nature (WWF).

Terrestrial
Lesotho is in the Afrotropical realm. Two of its three ecoregions are in the deserts and xeric shrublands biome.
 Eritrean coastal desert
 Ethiopian xeric grasslands and shrublands
 Ethiopian montane forests (Day Forest on the Goda massif)

References

Djibouti
 
ecoregions